Apoctena spatiosa is a species of moth of the family Tortricidae. It is found in New Zealand, where it is located on both the North and South islands.

The larvae feed on Griselinia species.

References

Moths described in 1923
Epitymbiini
Moths of New Zealand